The Administrative Office of the United States Courts (AO) or the Administrative Office (AO) for short, is the administrative agency of the United States federal court system, established in 1939. The central support entity for the federal judicial branch, the AO provides a wide range of legislative (legislative assistance), administrative, legal, financial, management, program (program evaluation), and information technology support services to the federal courts.

It is directly supervised by the Judicial Conference of the United States, the body that sets the national and legislative policy of the federal judiciary and is composed of the Chief Justice, chief judge of each court of appeals, a district court judge from each regional judicial circuit, and the chief judge of the United States Court of International Trade. The AO implements and executes Judicial Conference policies, as well as applicable federal statutes and regulations. The Office facilitates communications within the judiciary and with Congress, the executive branch, and the public on behalf of the judiciary. Administrative Office lawyers, public administrators, accountants, systems engineers, analysts, architects, statisticians, and other staff provide a wide variety of professional services to meet the needs of judges and more than 32,000 Judiciary employees working in more than 800 locations across the United States.

Mission

The mission of the Administrative Office of the United States Courts (AO) is to provide a variety of support functions to the United States federal judiciary. The AO prepares and submits the budget for the courts to the Judicial Conference for approval by Congress. It analyzes legislation from Congress that will affect the courts' operations or personnel, and it interprets and applies the new laws. It also provides administrative help to members of the courts in the form of clerks, probation and pretrial services officers, court reporters, and public defenders. It also works together with the General Services Administration to develop and operate suitable accommodations for federal courts, either in federal buildings or in standalone federal courthouses.

Structure
The director of the AO (currently Roslynn R. Mauskopf) serves as Secretary of the Judicial Conference and is appointed, along with the deputy director (currently Lee Ann Bennett), by the Chief Justice of the United States.  The AO includes an Office of the General Counsel, Office of Judicial Conference Executive Secretariat, Office of Public Affairs, Office of Legislative Affairs, Office of Judges Programs, Office of Court Administration, Office of Human Resources, Office of Finance and Budget, Office of Facilities and Security, Office of Defender Services, U.S. Probation and Pretrial Services System, Office of Information Technology, and an Office of Internal Services.

History
The Administrative Office of the U.S. Courts was established by an act of Congress on November 6, 1939.  With the establishment of the Administrative Office and the circuit judicial councils, Congress for the first time provided the judiciary with budgetary and personnel management agencies that were independent of the executive branch of government. For 150 years, administrative responsibility for the federal courts shifted from the Treasury Department to the Interior Department in 1849 and to the Justice Department in 1870. (The Conference of Senior Circuit Judges, established in 1922, was an advisory body.) By the late 1930s, a coalition of judges, lawyers, academics, and Justice Department officials agreed that the efficient administration of justice, as well as the principle of judicial independence, required a separate agency with officers appointed by and responsible to a body of judges.

By the early-twentieth century, some judges expressed concern that the Justice Department's administrative oversight of the courts was ineffective and, more importantly, posed the threat of interference with the judicial process. Reform proposals ranged from separate appropriation bills for the courts to the authorization of senior circuit judges as administrators for all the courts within their respective circuits. Some circuits established conferences of judges to discuss problems of case management and court administration. The Roosevelt administration's Judicial Reorganization Bill of 1937, best known for its provision to enlarge the Supreme Court, included provision for appointment of a proctor who would gather data on the business of the courts and make recommendations for reassignment of judges and improved case management. Many district court judges resisted this centralization of authority over individual courts that had operated with so much autonomy for a century and a half, but there was widespread support for some reform that would facilitate judicial business and eliminate the Justice Department's role in the daily operations of the federal courts.

After the defeat of Roosevelt's "court-packing" plan, Chief Justice Charles Evans Hughes responded to suggestions for less sweeping administrative changes. He appointed members of the Conference of Senior Circuit Judges to work with representatives of the American Bar Association and Justice Department officials to draft legislation that would improve the efficiency of the courts at the same time that it respected the decentralized character of the federal judicial system. The committee's proposed that the Administrative Office of the U.S. Courts would collect information on the caseload of the courts, prepare the annual budget request for the courts and disburse funds appropriated to the judiciary, and offer administrative assistance to the courts. The act authorized the Supreme Court to select the director of the Administrative Office, but, at the insistence of Chief Justice Hughes, the office was to operate under the supervision of the Conference of Senior Circuit Judges rather than the Court.
The committee proposal found broad support in both the Senate and House of Representatives, which considered several versions before passage in August 1939. The act established circuit judicial councils through which the courts of appeals judges would review the caseload reports of the Administrative Office and instruct district judges on what was necessary to expedite the courts' business. It also mandated annual circuit conferences at which circuit and district judges would meet with members of the bar to discuss judicial administration.

Directors of the Administrative Office

In preparation for the planned retirement of Director James C. Duff on January 31, 2021, Chief Justice John Roberts, on January 5, 2021, appointed Eastern District of NY Chief Judge Roslynn R. Mauskopf to be the next Director of the Administrative Office of the United States Courts effective February 1, 2021.

Past directors
Henry P. Chandler, 1939–1956
Warren Olney III, 1958–1967
Ernest C. Friesen, 1968–1970
Rowland F. Kirks, 1970–1977
William E. Foley, 1977–1985
Leonidas Ralph Mecham, 1985–2006
James C. Duff, 2006–2011 
Thomas F. Hogan, 2011–2013
John D. Bates, 2013–2015
James C. Duff, 2015–2021

See also 
 Judicial council (United States)
 California Administrative Office of the Courts

References

Further reading

External links
 Administrative Office of the United States Courts
 Administrative Office of the United States Courts in the Federal Register
 Judicial Conference of the United States in the Federal Register

1939 in American law
Federal judiciary of the United States
Government agencies established in 1939
Court administration
1939 establishments in Washington, D.C.